Frat Party at the Pankake Festival is the first documentary DVD by Linkin Park, released on November 20, 2001 through Warner Bros. Records and Warner Reprise Video. The DVD was produced by Bill Berg-Hillinger, Joe Hahn, David May and Angela Smith.

Synopsis 
The release documented the band on its touring cycle throughout to support the debut album, Hybrid Theory. It also features all four of the band's music videos up to that point, plus the "Cure for the Itch" and "Points of Authority" music videos (the latter was used to promote the DVD). It also includes bonus special features and several hidden easter eggs that unlock even more bonus special features.

Chapter listing

Guest appearances 
Disturbed members David Draiman and Dan Donegan appears in one scene for the DVD, where Draiman tries to guess how the name "Linkin Park" is pronounced next to Donegan saying "Lick My Part". Slipknot turntablist Sid Wilson appears on the DVD, where he is testing out Joe Hahn's turntables and disc jockeys in one scene. Deftones, including members Chino Moreno and Stephen Carpenter, appear in a few shots of one scene, where they were taking a photo before they played at a concert when Mike Shinoda was going undercover for the KGB, as Chester Bennington explained in one scene for the DVD that (as a joke) they were gonna destroy the Deftones by "...replacing their water...with Vodka...".

Personnel

Linkin Park 
 Chester Bennington – lead vocals
 Rob Bourdon – drums
 Brad Delson – lead guitar
 Joe Hahn – DJ, sampling
 Dave "Phoenix" Farrell – bass
 Mike Shinoda – MC, vocals, beats, sampling, rhythm guitar

Production 
 Produced by Bill Berg-Hillinger for Id Playground and Mr. Hahn
 Executive producer: Mr. Hahn
 Edited by Bill Berg-Hillinger
 DVD-video producers: David May for Warner Bros. Records and Angela Smith for Metropolis DVD
 Menu design and animation: Sean Donnelly, Metropolis DVD
 Technical director: James Moore, Metropolis DVD
 DVD authoring by Metropolis DVD, NYC
 Worldwide representation: Rob McDermott for the Firm
 Additional representation by: Carey Segura and Ryan DeMarti
 Booking agent: Mike Arfin for Artist Group International
 Legal: Danny Hayes for Selvern, Mandelbaum and Mintz
 Business manager: Michael Oppenheim and Jonathan Schwartz for Gudvi, Chapnick and Oppenheim
 Photography for package: James Minchin III
 Art direction and design: Tom Peanutz

Chart performance

Certifications

References 

2001 films
American documentary films
Linkin Park video albums
2001 video albums
Live video albums
Documentary films about heavy metal music and musicians
Warner Records video albums
2000s American films